Bookboon Learning is a digital learning service provider for corporate learning & development, providing eBooks, audio learning, online courses & learning.

Bookboon was originally founded in Denmark in 1988 under the name Ventus. Today, Bookboon operates globally with offices in London and Copenhagen.

Bookboon offers free university textbooks to students and content, focus lies on soft skills and personal development for bite-sized learning for professionals.

History and background
Bookboon started as a family business named Ventus in 1988 in Denmark. At that time, Ventus focused on publishing student textbooks. The owners of Ventus had two sons named Thomas Buus Madsen and Kristian Buus Madsen. In 2005, the two brothers took control of Ventus and in 2008 they re-named the company Bookboon. Soon after, the two brothers developed an innovative business model: offer free eBooks online financed by a few in-book ads, with a limit of 15% advertising space per book. The advertisers were companies looking to promote their career opportunities towards students and professionals.

In 2006, the company expanded its business model to Sweden, followed by Germany and the Netherlands in 2007. In 2008, Bookboon expanded its operations to the United Kingdom and started publishing eBooks in English.

Bookboon in the media
In 2016, Bookboon was highlighted for its activities on the African continent, especially in terms of offering free textbooks for students based on employer branding. This was reported by the Danish newspaper business.dk, the German international public broadcaster Deutsche Welle as well as CNBC South Africa.

References

Online publishing companies
Publishing companies based in London
Publishing companies of the United Kingdom
Publishing companies established in 1988
Ebook suppliers
British companies established in 1988